Zinc finger protein 320 is a protein that in humans is encoded by the ZNF320 gene.

Function

ZNF320 encodes a Kruppel-like zinc finger protein. Members of this protein family are involved in activation or repression of transcription.

References

Further reading 

Human proteins